Khash Darreh is the name of two villages in Badakhshan Province in north-eastern Afghanistan.

First village
 
This village lies in a ravine of the Kokcha River south of Bagh Mubarak, within the Khash District.

Second village

The second village lies west of Khaneqa.

References

Populated places in Yamgan District